Howard Colquhoun is Emeritus Professor of Materials Chemistry in the University of Reading. He was born (1951) in County Durham and was educated at Washington Grammar School and at the University of Cambridge (St Catharine's College; MA), before moving to the University of London as a postgraduate student in chemistry (Westfield College; PhD, 1975). At Cambridge he was a member of the University athletics team and was awarded a half-blue for throwing the discus. He carried out postdoctoral work at the University of Warwick, and was then a researcher at the ICI Corporate Laboratory in Cheshire where he and Fraser Stoddart developed a successful collaboration. In 1994 he moved to Manchester University as a Royal Society Industry Fellow. From 1997 he was Professor of Inorganic Chemistry at the University of Salford. In 2000 he was appointed to the Chair of Materials Chemistry in the University of Reading where, from 2002 to 2006, he served as Head of the School of Chemistry. In 2007 he was elected a Visiting Fellow of Clare Hall, University of Cambridge. His research has contributed to the fields of silicon chemistry, boron chemistry, transition-metal chemistry, dinitrogen chemistry, supramolecular chemistry, polymer chemistry and fractal chemistry, resulting in some 250 publications. Awards for his work include the RSC Medal and Prize for Materials Chemistry (2005), the degree of Doctor of Science (ScD) of the University of Cambridge (2008), the Wilsmore Fellowship of the University of Melbourne (2007), the Macro Group UK Medal for contributions to polymer science (2012), and the "Leverhulme" Senior Research Fellowship of the Royal Society (2006). He retired from Reading, becoming Professor Emeritus, in December 2018.

References

Living people
Westfield College
British chemists
Academics of the University of Reading
1951 births